"The Power of Gold" is a song by Dan Fogelberg and Tim Weisberg. It was released in 1978 as a single from their album Twin Sons of Different Mothers.

The song peaked at No. 24 on the Billboard Hot 100.

Chart performance

References

1978 songs
1978 singles
Songs written by Dan Fogelberg
Dan Fogelberg songs
Full Moon Records singles